La Madalena de Morcín Club de Fútbol is a Spanish football club based in Morcín, Asturias.

History
The team was founded in 2007. On 6 May 2018, Madalena promoted to Tercera División for the first time ever.

Season to season

Notable players
 Kily Álvarez

References

External links

Football clubs in Asturias
Association football clubs established in 2007
2007 establishments in Spain